The House of Montagu Douglas Scott, or simply Scott, is an aristocratic family in the United Kingdom, founded initially in the 15th century as Clan Scott. In the 17th century, James Scott, 1st Duke of Monmouth, eldest illegitimate son of Charles II, King of England, Scotland and Ireland, who would lead the Monmouth Rebellion married Anne Scott, 1st Duchess of Buccleuch. The family name was briefly Montagu-Scott, before the 5th Duke adopted its current form. It is one of only a handful of families in the English-speaking world to have an unhyphenated triple-barrelled name.

Dukes of Buccleuch 
Anne Scott, 1st Duchess of Buccleuch (1651-1732), wife of James FitzRoy, 1st Duke of Monmouth
Francis Scott, 2nd Duke of Buccleuch (1695-1751)
Henry Scott, 3rd Duke of Buccleuch (1746-1812)
Charles William Henry Montagu-Scott, 4th Duke of Buccleuch & 6th Duke of Queensberry (1772-1819)
Walter Montagu Douglas Scott, 5th Duke of Buccleuch (1806-1884)
William Montagu Douglas Scott, 6th Duke of Buccleuch (1831-1914)
John Montagu Douglas Scott, 7th Duke of Buccleuch (1864-1935)
Walter Montagu Douglas Scott, 8th Duke of Buccleuch (1894-1973)
John Scott, 9th Duke of Buccleuch (1923-2007)
Richard Walter John Montagu Douglas Scott, 10th Duke of Buccleuch and 12th Duke of Queensberry (1954-Current)

Other members of the Montagu Douglas Scott family:
Francis Scott, Earl of Dalkeith (1721-1750)
Lady Alice Montagu Douglas Scott, Princess Alice Duchess of Gloucester (1901–2004)
Henry Douglas-Scott-Montagu, 1st Baron Montagu of Beaulieu (1832-1905)
Lord Charles Montagu Douglas Scott (1839-1911), Royal Navy 
Lord William Montagu Douglas Scott (1896-1958), MP for Roxburgh and Selkirk (1935-1950)
Louisa Jane Montagu Douglas Scott, 6th Duchess of Buccleuch (1836-1912)
Mary Montagu Douglas Scott, 8th Duchess of Buccleuch, née Vreda Esther Mary Lascelles) (1900-1993)

Coats of Arms

Family Tree

In media
Nick Carraway, the narrator of F. Scott Fitzgerald's The Great Gatsby, says his family has "a tradition that we're descended from the Dukes of Buccleuch", but then points out that this is not true.

See also

Buccleuch, Scottish Borders
Clan Douglas
Clan Scott
Clan Stewart as they are descendants of the Duke of Monmouth, the eldest illegitimate son of King Charles II
 – several ships with that name

References

External links
Buccleuch Estates
 Montagu-Douglas-Scott Family Tree

Lists of Scottish people
Scottish society
Dumfries and Galloway

British landowners